Shasheem Rathour (born 16 October 1994) is an Indian cricketer who plays for Jharkhand. He made his Twenty20 debut on 7 January 2016 in the 2015–16 Syed Mushtaq Ali Trophy. He made his List A debut for Jharkhand in the 2016–17 Vijay Hazare Trophy on 6 March 2017.

References

External links
 

1994 births
Living people
Indian cricketers
Jharkhand cricketers
Cricketers from Patna